Chess at the 2018 Asian Para Games was held at Cempaka Putih Sport Hall, Jakarta, Indonesia from 7 to 12 October. The chess programme in 2018 includes four individual and team events; men's and women's individual rapid, and men's and women's individual standard.

Events
 Women's Individual Standard VI – B1
 Women's Individual Standard VI – B2/B3
 Women's Individual Standard P1
 Women's Team Standard VI – B1
 Women's Team Standard VI – B2/B3
 Women's Team Standard P1
 Women's Individual Rapid VI – B1
 Women's Individual Rapid VI – B2/B3
 Women's Individual Rapid P1
 Women's Team Rapid VI – B1
 Women's Team Rapid VI – B2/B3
 Women's Team Rapid P1
 Men's Individual Standard VI – B1
 Men's Individual Standard VI – B2/B3
 Men's Individual Standard P1
 Men's Team Standard VI – B1
 Men's Team Standard VI – B2/B3
 Men's Team Standard P1
 Men's Individual Rapid VI – B1
 Men's Individual Rapid VI – B2/B3
 Men's Individual Rapid P1
 Men's Team Rapid VI – B1
 Men's Team Rapid VI – B2/B3
 Men's Team Rapid P1

Medal table

Medalists

Men

Women

See also
Chess at the 2017 ASEAN Para Games

References

External links
RESULT SYSTEM - ASIAN PARA GAMES JAKARTA 2018

2018
2018 Asian Para Games events